The 2015 Qamishli bombings refer to three bombs, that detonated in three restaurants in Wusta, an Assyrian district of the Syrian-Turkish border town of Qamishli on 30 December 2015. The first reports stated, that it were suicide bombings, however the military spokesman of the Assyrian, Sootoro, in Qamishli, said, that the attacks were not suicide bombs. A Kurdish militia spokesman said, that the Islamic State of Iraq and the Levant was responsible for the blasts and that the bombings were targeting Christians, but Assyrian organisations claimed that the bombings were not likely a deed by ISIL, but possibly a crime by the Kurdish YPG. A total of 16 people were killed, 14 of the victims were Assyrian Christians and 2 Muslims, also 35 people were wounded.

Aftermath 

In the aftermath of the 2015 Qamishli bombings that targeted Assyrian Christian restaurants, the Assyrian Sootoro defense militia set up security checkpoints around the perimeter of the al-Wusta neighborhood, a predominantly Christian district of Qamishli.

On 12 January, at around 12:45, a group of Kurdish YPG fighters approached a GPF manned checkpoint and demanded that the militia take down the security barriers, stating that the checkpoints bothered residents and must be removed. When this was refused, a YPG gunner opened fire from a 30. or 50. caliber machine gun mounted on a technical vehicle. A GPF fighter was struck in the head and killed instantly. During the clashes, 3 YPG fighters were killed, 2 GPF were wounded, and 3 civilians were injured in the cross-fire.

See also 

 July 2016 Qamishli bombings

References 

2015 murders in Syria
Attacks on restaurants in Asia
December 2015 crimes in Asia
December 2015 events in Syria
Explosions in 2015
Improvised explosive device bombings in Syria
Mass murder in 2015
Mass murder in Syria
Persecution of Assyrians in Syria
2015 bombings
Terrorist incidents in Syria in 2015
Building bombings in Syria